Aigars Štokenbergs (born 29 August 1963 in Riga, Latvian SSR) is a Latvian politician from the Society for Other Politics party who served as the Minister of Justice from 3 November 2010 to 25 October 2011. Štokenbergs has also been Minister of Economics of Latvia from 8 April to 7 November 2006, and Minister of Regional Development and Local Governments of Latvia from 7 November 2006 to 19 October 2007.

References

1963 births
Living people
Politicians from Riga
People's Party (Latvia) politicians
Society for Political Change politicians
New Unity politicians
Ministers of Economics of Latvia
Ministers of Regional Development and Local Governments of Latvia
Ministers of Justice of Latvia
Deputies of the 9th Saeima
Deputies of the 10th Saeima